Vandazhi or Vandazhy may refer to

Vandazhi-I, a village in Palakkad district, Kerala, India
Vandazhi-II, a village in Palakkad district, Kerala, India
Vandazhy (gram panchayat), a gram panchayat for the above villages